The German community in Uruguay numbers ca. 10,000 German expatriates and 40,000 people of German descent. Most of them live in the Montevideo area, although there are German minorities in Paysandú, Río Negro, San José and Canelones.

History
One of the first Germans to come to the region was Ulrich Schmidl (known locally as Ulrico Smidel), who arrived at the oriental shores of the River Plate in the early 16th century and described the Charrúas.

The 2011 Uruguayan census revealed 1,167 people who declared Germany as their country of birth.

Religion
Local Germans practise different Christian religions: 
Roman Catholic: the Pallottine Fathers, with presence at the Church of Our Lady of Lourdes.
Evangelical Church: with its own temple at Juan Manuel Blanes 1116 in Montevideo.
Mennonite: there are four Mennonite settlements - Colonia Nicolich, El Ombú, Gartental, and Colonia Delta.
There is also an important presence of German Jews, with religious activities at the NCI Synagogue.

Institutions
German immigrants established several institutions of their own, among others:
 German School Montevideo (established 1857)
 German Evangelical Community
 German Cultural and Social Work
 German Club (established 1866)
 Uruguayan-German Chamber of Commerce and Industry (established 1916)
 German Rowing Club Montevideo (established 1922)
 German Male Choir
 Alpine Club Montevideo (established 1934)
 Bertolt Brecht House (established 1964)
 German-Uruguayan Cultural Association
 German Cultural Association Paysandú
 German-Uruguayan Friendship Circle
There are also local offices of German institutions:
 Friedrich Ebert Foundation in Uruguay
 Konrad Adenauer Foundation in Uruguay
 The Goethe-Institut offers courses on German language and culture.

Historic German schools:
 Deutsche Schule El-Ombu
 Deutsche Schule Gartental
 Deutsche Schule Delta (La Boyado)
 Deutsche Schule Paysandú

Notable people

Arts and entertainment
 Erika Büsch, musician
 Luis Camnitzer, artist
 Jorge Drexler, musician and doctor
 Andrés Neumann, cultural entrepreneur
 Carlos Ott, architect
 Carlos Rehermann, novelist and playwright
 Erwin Schrott, opera singer
 Carla Witte, painter

Politics
 Carlos Fischer (Colorado; President of the National Council of Government, 1958-1959)
 Héctor Grauert (Colorado; representative, minister, and member of the NCG)
 Julio César Grauert (Colorado hero, opposed the Dictatorship of Terra)
 Tabaré Hackenbruch (Colorado, three-term mayor of Canelones Department)
 Alberto Heber (Blanco; President of the National Council of Government, 1966-1967)
 Mario Heber (Blanco; representative and senator)
 Luis Alberto Heber (Blanco; senator, later minister in the cabinet of Luis Lacalle Pou)
 Roberto Kreimerman (Frente Amplio; minister of Industry, Energy and Mining in the cabinet during José Mujica's presidency)

Sports
 Carlos Grossmüller, footballer
 Gary Kagelmacher, footballer
 Dominique Knüppel, Olympic sailor
 Nicolás Klappenbach, rugby union player
 Martín Kutscher, swimmer
 Paul Kutscher, swimmer
 Sergio Orteman, footballer
 Gerardo Vonder Pütten, footballer

Other professions
 Daniel Altschuler, physician
 Elio García-Austt, neuroscientist
 Otto Langmann, pastor
 Mariana Meerhoff, biologist
 Siegbert Rippe, commercial jurist
 Bernardo Rosengurtt, botanist and agrostologist
 Ernesto Schmitt, entrepreneur
 Rodolfo Wirz, Roman Catholic bishop of Maldonado and Punta del Este

See also

 German people
 German diaspora
 German Argentine
 Germany-Uruguay relations
 Austrians in Uruguay
 Mennonites in Uruguay
 Uruguayans in Germany

References

External links
 German presence in Uruguay 

 
Uruguay
European Uruguayan
Immigration to Uruguay
 
Ethnic groups in Uruguay